Collum may refer to:

 , the Latin term for neck
 Collum (millipedes), the first segment behind the head of millipedes

Surnames
 Herbert Collum (1914-1982), German organist, harpsichordist, composer, and conductor
 Hugh Collum (1940–2005), British businessman
 Jackie Collum (born 1927), American Major League Baseball pitcher 
 Jason Paul Collum (born 1973), American film maker
 John Collum (1926–1962), American actor
 Vera Collum (1883–1957), British journalist, suffragist, anthropologist, photographer, radiographer and writer
 Willie Collum (born 1979), Scottish football referee

See also
 Columella (disambiguation)
 Column (disambiguation)
 Cervix (disambiguation)
 Neck (disambiguation)